Elections for the Scottish Borders Council took place on Thursday 1 May 2003, alongside the wider Scottish local elections.

No party held a majority, with the largest grouping - local Independents - winning 14 of the council's 34 seats.

Aggregate results

Ward results

References

2003 Scottish local elections
2003